Gülpınar may refer to:

 Gülpınar, Ayvacık
 Gülpınar, Gülağaç, a village in Aksaray Province, Turkey
 Gülpınar, Gülşehir, a village in Gülşehir district, Nevşehir Province, Turkey
 Gülpınar, Polatlı, a village in Ankara Province, Turkey
 Gülpınar, Samsat, a village in Adıyaman Province, Turkey
 Serhat Gülpınar, Turkish footballer

Turkish-language surnames